Tarsia is a town and comune in the province of Cosenza in the Calabria region of southern Italy. The ancient town of Caprasia is thought to be the modern Tarsia.

Geography
The municipality borders with Bisignano, Corigliano Calabro, Roggiano Gravina, San Demetrio Corone, San Lorenzo del Vallo, San Marco Argentano, Santa Sofia d'Epiro, Spezzano Albanese and Terranova da Sibari.

History 
During World War II, Benito Mussolini built Italy's largest fascist concentration camp there, the Ferramonti internment camp. Imprisoned there were mainly Jews and ethnic minorities considered as enemies by the fascist regime. The camp was liberated by the British on September 14, 1943.

See also
Ferramonti di Tarsia

References

 

Cities and towns in Calabria